Benjamin Steffen (born 8 March 1982) is a Swiss left-handed épée fencer, three-time team European champion, 2018 team world champion, and 2016 Olympian.

Between 2006 and 2016, Steffen won two silver medals and two bronze medals at FIE Men's Épée Grands Prix.

Between 2007 and 2009, Steffen won one silver medal and two bronze medals at FIE Men's Épée World Cups.

Steffen began fencing at the age of 7 on his brother Andreas' suggestion. His sister Tabea is also an épée fencer.

Medal Record

World Championship

European Championship

Grand Prix

World Cup

References

External links

Profile at Fechtgesellschaft Basel

Swiss male fencers
Swiss épée fencers
1982 births
Sportspeople from Basel-Stadt
Living people
Olympic fencers of Switzerland
Fencers at the 2016 Summer Olympics
Universiade medalists in fencing
Universiade silver medalists for Switzerland
World Fencing Championships medalists
Medalists at the 2003 Summer Universiade
Medalists at the 2009 Summer Universiade
Fencers at the 2020 Summer Olympics